The 2nd Canadian Film Awards were presented on April 19, 1950 to honour achievements in Canadian film. The ceremony was hosted by Prime Minister Louis St. Laurent.

Winners
Film of the Year: Not awarded
Theatrical Short: La terre de Caïn (North Shore) — National Film Board of Canada, James Beveridge producer, Pierre Petel director
Honourable Mention: Summer Is for Kids — National Film Board of Canada, Sydney Newman producer, Stanley Jackson director
Non-Theatrical, Open: Family Circles — National Film Board of Canada, Gudrun Parker and Tom Daly  producers, Morten Parker director
Honourable Mention: Children's Concert — National Film Board of Canada, Gudrun Parker producer and director
Non-Theatrical, Sponsored: Science at Your Service — National Film Board of Canada, Tom Daly producer, Ronald Dick director
Honourable Mention: Zéro de conduite (Winter Blunderland) — Crawley Films, F. R. Crawley producer 
Amateur: Mouvement perpétuel (Perpetual Movement) — Claude Jutra producer and director
Honourable Mention: In the Daytime — Stanley Fox, Peter Varley producers
Special Awards: Primitive Artists of Haiti — Benoît and de Tonnancourt Films, Réal Benoît, André de Tonnancourt producers, "for its successful attempt to interpret other cultures and other peoples to Canadians".
Begone Dull Care — National Film Board of Canada, Norman McLaren producer, Norman McLaren and Evelyn Lambart  directors - "in recognition of the successful contribution of an experimental approach to filmmaking by Norman McLaren and his associates".
Quebec Productions, Paul L'Anglais and René Germain producers, "for sustained and creative effort in establishing a feature-length film industry in Canada" (through its creation of the films The Village Priest (Le Curé de Village), Whispering City/La Forteresse, A Man and His Sin (Un homme et son péché) and Séraphin.)

Special Citations:
The Canadian Heritage — Audio Films
Animules — Louis Shore
Borderline Cases — Associated Screen Studios, Bernard Norrish producer, Gordon Sparling director
Ballet Festival — National Film Board of Canada, Don Mulholland producer, Roger Blais director
Portrait — Robert Sparks, Phyllis Mawdsley
A Mile Below the Wheat — Crawley Films, Gerald Moses director
The Rising Tide — National Film Board of Canada, James Beveridge producer, Jean Palardy director

References

Canadian
02
1950 in Canada